Guisti is a town located in southeastern of Ali Sabieh Region. It is situated about 32 kilometres (20 miles) Southeast of Ali Sabieh, near the borders with Somalia and Ethiopia.

Overview
The town lies along on a river. Nearby towns and villages include Holhol (42 km), Assamo (18 km) and Ali Adde (17 km).

Climate

Demographics
As of 2012, the population of Guisti has been estimated to be 500. The town inhabitants belong to various mainly Afro-Asiatic-speaking ethnic groups, with the Issa Somali predominant.

References

Populated places in Djibouti